Chavaj railway station is a small railway station on the Western Railway network in the state of Gujarat, India. It serves Chavaj village. Passenger and MEMU trains halt here.

References

Railway stations in Bharuch district
Vadodara railway division